Baron Crewe, of Crewe in the County of Chester, was a title in the Peerage of the United Kingdom. It was created on 25 February 1806 for the politician and landowner John Crewe, of Crewe Hall, Cheshire. This branch of the Crewe (or Crew) family descended from Sir Ranulph Crewe (1558–1646), Speaker of the House of Commons and Lord Chief Justice of the King's Bench. He was the brother of Sir Thomas Crewe, also Speaker of the House of Commons and the father of John Crew, 1st Baron Crew (a title which became extinct in 1721; see Baron Crew). Sir Ranulph's grandson John Crewe was the father of Ann Crewe, who married John Offley, of Madeley Manor, Staffordshire. Their son John assumed by Act of Parliament the surname of Crewe in lieu of his patronymic in 1708. He sat as a Knight of the Shire for Cheshire. His son John Crewe also represented Cheshire in Parliament. The latter was the father of the first Baron Crewe. Lord Crewe died in 1829 and was succeeded by his son, the second Baron. He was a General in the British Army. The title became extinct on the death of his son, the third Baron, in 1894.

The Honourable Annabella, daughter of the second Baron, married Richard Monckton Milnes, 1st Baron Houghton. Their son Robert succeeded to the Crewe estates on the death of his maternal uncle in 1894 and assumed the same year the additional surname of Crewe by Royal licence. He became a distinguished Liberal politician and was created Earl of Crewe in 1895 and Marquess of Crewe in 1911. See the latter title for more information.

Richard Crewe, brother of the first Baron, was a Major-General in the British Army. His great-grandson Sir Charles Preston Crewe (1858–1936) was a Brigadier-General in the South African Defence Force and a member of the Legislative Council of the Union of South Africa.

Barons Crewe (1806)
John Crewe, 1st Baron Crewe (1742–1829)
John Crewe, 2nd Baron Crewe (1772–1835)
Hungerford Crewe, 3rd Baron Crewe (1812–1894)

Arms

See also
Baron Crew
Marquess of Crewe

References

Extinct baronies in the Peerage of the United Kingdom
Noble titles created in 1806
Noble titles created for UK MPs